Nebraska's Centennial Mall, also known simply as Centennial Mall, is a seven-block-long public space in Lincoln, Nebraska, stretching from the Nebraska State Capitol building north to the University of Nebraska - Lincoln's city campus.

History 
In 1922, the architect of the Nebraska State Capitol, Bertram Goodhue, proposed a seven-block-long avenue to create a more formal approach to the Capitol's north entrance. Fifteen years later in 1937, the city and state designated a 120-foot-wide right of way from the Capitol to the University of Nebraska - Lincoln campus and created a commission to begin work on the Mall. The project was completed in 1967 to commemorate the centennial of Nebraska's statehood.

From 1967 to 2009, the Mall remained largely unchanged and fell into disrepair. In order to enhance the visual beauty, ease of pedestrian use, and accessibility of the space, the Lincoln Parks Foundation began raising money to renovate Centennial Mall in 2009. Through both public and private funding, the project was completed by Clark Enersen Partners in 2016.

Description 
Following the $19.6 million renovation completed in 2016, Centennial Mall features many interactive and educational opportunities, including plaques with QR codes which can be scanned to learn more about industries, important figures, and historical sites. The space was divided into three zones, each exploring a different theme related to Nebraska: Civic, Community, and Campus.

Civic Zone 
This area of Centennial Mall explores the themes of "We the People" and "Our Home Nebraska." "We the People," which extends from "K" to "L" streets is a large, formal plaza with elements that celebrate the democratic process, watchful citizens, and state leaders. "Our Home Nebraska" focuses on the geographic features, natural resources, and stewardship of the land of Nebraska. The major rivers and ecoregions of the state are represented through a large outline of the state in the pavement.

Community Zone 
The three central blocks of Centennial Mall, which stretch from "M" to "P" streets are open to automobile traffic and focus on the theme "Mosaic of Nebraskans." The sidewalks in this area have been widened to allow donors to inscribe paving stones with the names of individuals, families, communities, and organizations from Nebraska.

Campus Zone 
The final two blocks of Centennial Mall, "P" to "R" streets, reflect the importance of the University of Nebraska in shaping both Lincoln and Nebraska as a whole. This space celebrates innovators, educators, and artists from Nebraska. Housed between the College of Journalism and Mass Communications and the Lincoln Children's Museum, this area features an art alcove, water features, and an amphitheater to celebrate and encourage creativity and artistic expression.

Standing Bear Statue 
In 2017, a ten-foot-tall statue honoring Chief Standing Bear of the Ponca Tribe was unveiled on Centennial Mall in the Campus Zone. The bronze Standing Bear statue, created by Ben Victor, references the "Standing Lincoln" statue memorializing Abraham Lincoln which stands in front of the Nebraska State Capitol building. The unveiling ceremony featured dancers from the Winnebago Tribe, a dedication by mayor Chris Beutler, a reception following the event, and a sale of the artist's maquettes of the statue to benefit a Native American scholarship fund.

See also 

 Lincoln, Nebraska
 History of Nebraska
 History of Lincoln, Nebraska
 University of Nebraska–Lincoln

References 

Parks in Nebraska
Geography of Lincoln, Nebraska
Tourist attractions in Lincoln, Nebraska